Kulkanovo (Qolqan) is a rural locality (a village) in Saitbabinsky Selsoviet, Gafuriysky District, Bashkortostan, Russia. The population was 166 as of 2010. There are two streets.

Geography 
Kulkanovo is located 32 km northeast of Krasnousolsky (the district's administrative centre) by road. Saitbaba is the nearest rural locality.

References 

Rural localities in Gafuriysky District